Diaphus danae, the Dana lanternfish, is a species of lanternfish 
found in the Atlantic and Indian Oceans.

Size

Etymology
The fish is named in honor of the Danish research vessel Dana, from which the type specimen was collected.

References

Myctophidae
Taxa named by Åge Vedel Tåning
Fish described in 1932